Sankhwar, or Shankwar is an subcaste of Koli caste. Sankhwar also pronounce as Shakya and Shakyawar originating mostly in Kanpur, Fatehpur, Banda, Allahabad, Hamirpur, Jhansi, Baraily and Jalaun districts of Uttar Pradesh. Shankwar Kolis joined the Akhil Bhartiya Kshatriya Koli Mahasabha and worked for the upliftment of Koli society.

Notable 
Pyare Lal Sankhwar (born 1955), Indian politician
Ashkaran Sankhwar (born 1945), Indian politician
Nirmala Sankhwar (born 1969), Indian politician

References 

Indian surnames